Lornevale is a community in the Canadian province of Nova Scotia, located in  Colchester County.  The community is not to be confused with Lorneville, of similar spelling.

References
Lornevale on Destination Nova Scotia

Communities in Colchester County
General Service Areas in Nova Scotia